Fateixa is an uninhabited mountain valley near the west coast of the island of São Vicente in Cape Verde. It is 7 km west from the city of Mindelo and 4 km north of São Pedro. It is accessed by the mountain pass Selada de Fateixa. It is surrounded by 300–400 m high mountains, including Cabeça de Gato and Monte de Carrachiça.

References

Geography of São Vicente, Cape Verde